Renal oligopeptide reabsorption is the part of renal physiology that deals with the retrieval of filtered oligopeptides, preventing them from disappearing from the body through the urine.

Almost all reabsorption takes place in the proximal tubule. Practically nothing is left in the final urine. Longer oligopeptides, such as angiotensin  and glutathione are degraded by enzymes on the brush border, while shorter ones, such as carnosine, are transported across the apical membrane as a whole by the PepT 1 transporter, and degraded inside the proximal tubule cell.

Overview table

References

Renal physiology